5 Fulton is a trolleybus line operated by the San Francisco Municipal Railway (Muni). It is one of several routes which connects the Outer Sunset to the Financial District.

Route description
The line runs from the Transbay Transit Center to Cabrillo and La Playa in the Outer Sunset primarily via McAllister and Fulton Streets. Local service during the day midweek is a short turn that terminates outbound at Fulton and 6th Avenue. Much of the route runs adjacent to Golden Gate Park. The 5R Fulton Rapid runs an identical route, but making limited stops to speed end to end travel times.

The route operates 24 hours with less frequent short turn Owl service overnight as part of the All Nighter network.

History
The Line was originally established as the McAllister streetcar in 1906, running on Market Street, McAllister, Central and Masonic and Fulton. It acquired the number 5 in 1909, being the fifth of the United Railroads of San Francisco lines to turn off Market Street. Tracks were extended to the ocean at La Playa and Balboa Streets in 1911. Rail service was replaced by buses on June 5, 1948, and trolleybus operation began on July 3 the following year.

The line was renamed to the 5 Fulton in 1976. Service was extended to Cabrillo and La Playa in 1995. The 5L (later 5R) was established in 2013. Safety and speed enhancements were implemented throughout the corridor between the late 2000s and early 2020s, including bulb-outs, 60-foot articulated buses, and bus lanes, among others.

References

Bibliography

External links

 5 Fulton — via San Francisco Municipal Transportation Agency

San Francisco Municipal Railway trolleybus routes
Railway lines closed in 1948